Stewart Alexander Adams (September 16, 1904 in Calgary, Northwest Territories – May 18, 1978 in Calgary, Alberta) was a professional ice hockey player in the National Hockey League. He played for the Chicago Black Hawks and Toronto Maple Leafs between 1929 and 1933.

Playing career
He began his NHL career with the Chicago Black Hawks in 1929–30 and played there for three seasons. For the 1932–33 NHL season, he left Chicago for Toronto and played for the Maple Leafs. In 93 NHL games, he scored 9 goals and 35 points.

Career statistics

Regular season and playoffs

External links
 

1904 births
1978 deaths
Calgary Tigers players
Canadian expatriate ice hockey players in the United States
Canadian ice hockey left wingers
Chicago Blackhawks players
London Tecumsehs players
Minneapolis Millers (AHA) players
Ice hockey people from Calgary
Syracuse Stars (IHL) players
Toronto Maple Leafs players